Vlad Gribincea (born April 22, 1980) is a lawyer from Chişinău and Executive director of the "Legal Resources Centre form Moldova". He holds a degree in law from the State University of Moldova and an LL.M. from the same university (2003). Gribincea's main specialization as lawyer is the representation of applicants before the European Court of Human Rights. He is known for Ilaşcu and Others v. Moldova and Russia and Guja v. Moldova cases and for being the lawyer of Gabriel Stati.

On October 19, 2008, he married Olimpia Iovu at St. Teodora de la Sihla Church, Viorica and Vitalie Nagacevschi being their marriage godparents. Olimpia Iovu has worked for 3 years for the Governmental Agent Department of the Ministry of Justice (Moldova) and since 2005 for ABA Rule of Law Initiative, providing expertise on criminal law issues.

Awards 
 Chevening Scholarship, 2005
 Premiul VIP în domeniul dreptului, 2004

References

External links 
 Vlad Gribincea

1980 births
People from Rîșcani District
Moldovan jurists
Living people